The Last Wagon is a 1943 Italian comedy film directed by Mario Mattoli and starring Aldo Fabrizi, Anna Magnani, and Anita Durante. A number of the personnel were involved in the subsequent development of neorealism. The hero is the driver of a horse-drawn carriage who objects to the competition from motorised taxis. The film's sets were designed by the art directors Piero Filippone and Mario Rappini. It was shot at the Palatino Studios in Rome and on location around the city.

Cast
 Aldo Fabrizi as Antonio Urbani, detto "Toto"
 Anna Magnani as Mary Dunchetti, la canzonettista
 Anita Durante as Adele Urbani
 Elide Spada as Nannarella Urbani
 Enzo Fiermonte as Roberto Pinelli, l'autista
 Aristide Garbini as Pasquale, suo padre
 Lauro Gazzolo as Andrea, il portiere
 Tino Scotti as Valentino Doriani, il comico
 Nando Bruno as Augusto Pallotta, il vetturino
 Leopoldo Valentini as Ottone Roncucci detto "Paradiso"
 Oreste Fares as Il medico
 Marina Doge as L'amica di Nannarella
 Olga Solbelli as La padrona della pensione "Flora"
 Vittorio Cuomo as Filippo, il padrone dell'osteria
 Renato Mariani as Il signor sul treno

References

Bibliography
 Brunetta, Gian Piero. The History of Italian Cinema: A Guide to Italian Film from Its Origins to the Twenty-first Century.  Princeton University Press, 2009.
 Wagstaff, Christopher. Italian Neorealist Cinema: An Aesthetic Approach. University of Toronto Press, 2007.

External links

1943 films
Italian comedy films
1940s Italian-language films
Italian black-and-white films
Films directed by Mario Mattoli
1943 comedy films
Films with screenplays by Federico Fellini
Films shot in Rome
Films shot at Palatino Studios
1940s Italian films